Dorcadion maceki is a species of beetle in the family Cerambycidae. It was described by Holzschuh in 1995. It is known from Turkey.

References

maceki
Beetles described in 1995